Signs of Change is a progressive rock album by After the Fire. Released 1978, after attempting to get a record contract, the band got this made themselves at a time when this was all but unheard of. What was more of interest as that it sold out its initial 2000 copy run within two weeks with little or no media publicity. The band went on to change musical direction, leaving behind most of the progressive stylistic markers and redefining themselves as new wave. With a contract from Epic they went on to more success throughout the 1980s.

They recorded mainly at ICC Studios in Eastbourne, England (engineers: Andy Kidd and Dave Aston).

Track listing

Original LP
Disc - Total time 42:04
Side 1
 "Dance of the Marionette" – 7:00
 "Back to the Light" – 4:30
 "Now That I've Found" – 8:10

Side 2
 "Signs of Change" – 8:04
 "Jigs" – 2:58
 "Pilgrim" – 11:22

CD
Disc - Total time 74:46
 "Dance of the Marionette" – 7:00
 "Back to the Light" – 4:30
 "Now That I've Found" – 8:10
 "Signs of Change" – 8:04
 "Jigs" – 2:58
 "Pilgrim" – 11:22
Bonus tracks (available only on the CD):
 "Samaritan Woman" – 11:01
 "Dreamaway" – 9:50
 "Hallelujah" – 6:31
 "Back to the Light" – 5:09 (demo version)

Release details
1977, UK, Rapid Records, released 1978, LP
2005, UK, RoughMix, released 3 January 2005, CD (with bonus tracks)

Personnel
Band
 Peter Banks – Hammond C3, mini Moog, Crumar Multiman, piano, vocals
 Andy Piercy – electric guitars, acoustic guitars, lead vocals, tambourines
 Nick Battle – bass guitar, vocals
 Ivor Twidell – drums

Others (on bonus tracks)
 Robin Childs – bass guitar
 Ian Adamson – drums

External links
 After The Fire discography at afterthefire.co.uk

1978 debut albums
Concept albums
After the Fire albums